Allen Limb (29 September 1886 – 1 July 1975) was an Australian cricketer. He played three first-class matches for Tasmania between 1923 and 1929.

See also
 List of Tasmanian representative cricketers

References

External links
 

1886 births
1975 deaths
Australian cricketers
Tasmania cricketers
Cricketers from Tasmania
People from Gawler, South Australia